The 54th General Assembly of Prince Edward Island was in session from June 6, 1978, to March 27, 1979. The Liberal Party led by Alex Campbell formed the government. Bennett Campbell became party leader and Premier in September 1978.

Russell Perry was elected speaker.

There was one session of the 54th General Assembly:

Members

Kings

Prince

Queens

Notes:

References
 Election results for the Prince Edward Island Legislative Assembly, 1978-04-24
 O'Handley, Kathryn Canadian Parliamentary Guide, 1994 

Terms of the General Assembly of Prince Edward Island
1978 establishments in Prince Edward Island
1979 disestablishments in Prince Edward Island